The Calumet Downtown Historic District is a historic district located in Calumet, Michigan, on 5th Street and 6th Street, between Scott Street and Pine Street. It is also known as the Red Jacket Downtown Historic District, reflecting the original name of the village. The Historic District is completely contained in the Calumet Historic District (a National Historic Landmark District) and the Keweenaw National Historical Park. It was designated a Michigan State Historic Site in 1973 and listed on the National Register of Historic Places in 1974. Much of the 100 block of 5th street was destroyed in a fire that took place on May 22, 2021

History
The village of Calumet, then known as "Red Jacket," was originally settled in 1864, and was incorporated in 1867.  Calumet was an offshoot of the Calumet and Hecla Mining Company, which mined a rich vein of copper running just south of Calumet.  From 1868 through 1886, it was the leading copper producer in the United States, and from 1869 through 1876, the leading copper producer in the world.

As the fortunes of the Calumet and Hecla Mining Company went, so went the fortunes of Calumet.  The majority of the structures in the downtown Calumet district were constructed in the years between 1880 and 1910, when the copper mining industry was at its peak. The structures reflect the progress of Calumet's fortunes as first frame, and then more substantial sandstone and brick business blocks, were built.

Description 
The Calumet Downtown Historic District consists of sixty-two structures.  These buildings along Fifth and Sixth Streets comprise the main commercial section of Calumet.  These structures include buildings with a frame or shingle exterior, ones covered with metal sheeting, sandstone buildings, brick buildings, and those constructed of a combination of sandstone and brick.  These structures define the streetscape of the downtown, with some presenting imposing facades. Many buildings are embellished with common stock elements purchased by the builders; some of these elements are used in combinations, including terra cotta trim, metal cornices, turrets, and cast iron thresholds and columns.

The copper strike in 1913 created an economic depression in the area whose effects lingered for decades.  Many commercial buildings have had their facades altered, but for the most part these treatments have been
applied over original material and are reversible.

Two substantial buildings, St. Anne's Roman Catholic Church and the Calumet Opera House, anchor the district at the south and the north ends, respectively.  In addition, the Calumet Fire Station, now the Upper Peninsula Fire Fighters Memorial Museum, is also located in the district. One of the youngest structures within the Historic District is the 1948 Woolworth's building. The F.W. Woolworth company remained in operation at this site the 1980s. The structure, which looks out of place amongst its older counterparts, shares a very important part of our American retail history.

Further reading
Downtown Calumet from the Keweenaw National Historic Park

External links
Main Street Calumet
Keweenaw National Historical Park, downtown Calumet
Hunt's Guide to Downtown Calumet (tourist information)

References

Historic districts in Houghton County, Michigan
Michigan State Historic Sites in Houghton County
Historic district contributing properties in Michigan
Historic districts on the National Register of Historic Places in Michigan
National Register of Historic Places in Houghton County, Michigan